The Women's 100m Freestyle event at the 2003 Pan American Games took place on August 12, 2003 (Day 11 of the Games).

Medalists

Records

Results

Notes

References
usaswimming

Freestyle, Women's 100m
2003 in women's swimming
Swim